Sie Yi-lin (born 19 March 1990), also known as Evonne Sie, is a Taiwanese actress. Sie made her acting debut in Chinese film series Tiny Times (2013-2015), which helped her achieve popularity in the Greater China region.

Filmography

Films 
 Tiny Times (2013)
 Tiny Times 2 (2013)
 Dating Fever (2013)
 My Boy 4 Friends (2013)
 Tiny Times 3 (2014)
 Women Who Flirt (2014)
 Love Evolutionism (2014)
 Running Man (2015)
 You Are My Sunshine (2015)
 Tiny Times 4 (2015)
 Love Godfathers —Three naughty boys (2016)
 Mission Milano (2016)
 A Nail Clippers Romance (2017) 
 Didi's Dream (2017)
 The Faces of My Gene (2018)
 Lost in Love (2019)
 Always Miss You (2019)

Television
Nice to Meet You (2012)
PMAM (2013)
Never Give Up Dodo (2013)
 Love Weaves Through a Millennium (2015)
 Win the World (2017)

References

External links 
 Evonne Sie on Facebook
 Evonne Sie on Weibo

1990 births
Living people
Taiwanese film actresses
Taiwanese television actresses
People from Hualien County
21st-century Taiwanese actresses
Participants in Chinese reality television series
The Amazing Race contestants